Strathglass is a strath or wide and shallow valley in the Northwest Highlands of Scotland down which runs the meandering  River Glass from the point at which it starts at the confluence of the River Affric and Abhainn Deabhag to the point where, on joining with the River Farrar at Struy, the combined waters become the River Beauly.

The A831 road runs southwest from the vicinity of Erchless Castle up the length of Strathglass and serves the village of Cannich which is the largest settlement within the valley. The road then runs east from here via Glen Urquhart to Drumnadrochit beside Loch Ness. A minor road continues southwest up the valley from Cannich towards Glen Affric. Strathglass was also followed by a line of electricity pylons but that has been replaced by a line of new pylons across Eskdale Moor to the east of the strath. Both flanks of the valley are heavily wooded; on the higher ground to the northwest, beyond the forests are the moors of Struy Forest and Balmore Forest.

Strathglass has been carved out by water and glacial action along the line of the Strathglass Fault through Loch Eil Group psammites of the Moine Supergroup. The northeast-southwest aligned fault is a Caledonoid tectonic feature. The floor of the valley is formed from alluvium deposited by the river, backed by remnant river terraces in places.

Local residents
 Fr. Alexander Cameron (1701 - 19 October 1746) a nobleman from Clan Cameron and a Roman Catholic priest. Prior to the Uprising of 1745, Fr. Cameron ran a highly successful apostolate for the still illegal and underground Catholic Church in Scotland in both Lochaber and Strathglass. After the Battle of Culloden in 1746, Fr. Cameron was captured by the British Army and later died aboard a prison hulk anchored in the Thames River. He is currently being promoted by the Knights of St Columba for Canonization by the Roman Catholic Church.
Aeneas Chisholm (1759-1818), a Roman Catholic priest and bishop who served as Vicar Apostolic of the Highland District.
 Catriona Nic Fhearghais, war poetess and wife of a Clan Chisholm Tacksman, William Chisholm of Strathglass. Catriona composed one of the most iconic verse laments in Scottish Gaelic literature after her husband fell fighting with the Jacobite Army at the Battle of Culloden in 1746.
 Rt.-Rev. William Fraser (c.1779-1851), first Bishop of the Roman Catholic Diocese of Halifax and then the first Bishop of the Diocese of Arichat. Folk hero in both Scottish and Canadian folklore.

References

Strathglass
Geography of Inverness
Valleys of Highland (council area)